The United States Global Change Research Program (USGCRP) coordinates and integrates federal research on changes in the global environment and their implications for society. The program began as a presidential initiative in 1989 and was codified by Congress through the Global Change Research Act of 1990 (P.L. 101-606), which called for "a comprehensive and integrated United States research program which will assist the Nation and the world to understand, assess, predict, and respond to human-induced and natural processes of global change."

Thirteen departments and agencies participate in the USGCRP, which was known as the U.S. Climate Change Science Program from 2002 through 2008. The program is steered by the Subcommittee on Global Change Research under the Committee on Environment, Natural Resources and Sustainability, overseen by the Executive Office of the President, and facilitated by a National Coordination Office.

Since its inception, the USGCRP has supported research and observational activities in collaboration with several other national and international science programs.

These activities led to major advances in several key areas including:
 Observing and understanding short- and long-term changes in climate, the ozone layer, and land cover;
 Identifying the impacts of these changes on ecosystems and society;
 Estimating future changes in the physical environment, and vulnerabilities and risks associated with those changes; and
 Providing scientific information to enable effective decision making to address the threats and opportunities posed by climate and global change.

These advances have been documented in numerous assessments commissioned by the program and have played prominent roles in international assessments such as those of the Intergovernmental Panel on Climate Change. Program results and plans are documented in the program's annual report, Our Changing Planet.

Definition of global change
The Global Change Research Act of 1990 defines global change as: "Changes in the global environment (including alterations in climate, land productivity, oceans or other water resources, atmospheric chemistry, and ecological systems) that may alter the capacity of the Earth to sustain life."

Participating agencies
Thirteen U.S. federal agencies—the USDA, DOC, DOD, DOE, HHS, DOI, DOS, DOT, EPA, NASA, NSF, Smithsonian Institution, and the USAID—participate in the USGCRP.

National Climate Assessment (NCA)

The USGCRP have produced four National Climate Assessments: NCA1 entitled "Climate Change Impacts on the United States: the Potential Consequences of Climate Variability and Change" in 2000, NCA2 entitled "Global Climate Change Impacts in the United States" in 2009, NCA3 entitled "Global Climate Change Impacts in the United States" in 2014, and NCA4 in two volumes—Volume 1 entitled "Climate Science Special Report" (CSSR) released October 2017 and Volume 2 entitled "Impacts, Risks, and Adaptation in the United States" released on November 23, 2018.

Strategic planning
The USGCRP Strategic Plan for 2012-2021 maintains an emphasis on advancing global change science and research, but it also calls for a new focus on ensuring our science informs real-world decisions and actions. Moving forward, the strategic goals of USGCRP are to:
 Advance Science (Study Climate and Global Change)--Advance scientific knowledge of the integrated natural and human components of the Earth system  
 Inform Decisions (Prepare the Nation for Change)--Provide the scientific basis to inform and enable timely decisions on adaptation and mitigation  
 Conduct Sustained Assessments (Assess the U.S. Climate)--Build sustained assessment capacity that improves the Nation’s ability to understand, anticipate, and respond to global change impacts and vulnerabilities  
 Communicate and Educate (Make Our Science Accessible)--Advance communications and education to broaden public understanding of global change and develop the scientific workforce of the future

The USGCRP has been guided over time by the following strategic plans.
 2012: National Global Change Research Plan 2012-2021
 2008: Revised Research Plan: An Update to the 2003 Strategic Plan
 2003: Strategic Plan for the U.S. Climate Change Science Program
 1989: Our Changing Planet: The FY 1990 Research Plan
 1989: Our Changing Planet: A U.S. Strategy for Global Change Research

In 2003, the program undertook a series of "listening sessions" with a variety of stakeholder groups around the country to gain a better understanding of the emerging needs for climate information and ways in which federal research might be shaped to meet those needs. Stakeholder engagement that is a central element of the program's national assessment

Program elements

The USGCRP's thirteen participating agencies coordinate their work through Interagency Working Groups (IWGs) that span a wide range of interconnected issues of climate and global change. The IWGs address major components of the Earth’s environmental and human systems, as well as cross-disciplinary approaches for addressing issues under the purview of the USGCRP.  The IWGs are composed of representatives from federal departments and agencies responsible for activities in each area. The IWGs are overseen by the Subcommittee on Global Change Research.

Interagency Working Groups:
Carbon Cycle Interagency Working Group
Federal Adaptation and Resilience Group
Indicators Interagency Working Group
Integrated Observations Interagency Working Group
Interagency Crosscutting Group on Climate Change and Human Health
Interagency Group on Integrative Modeling
Interagency Integrated Water Cycle Group and the U.S. Global Energy and Water Exchanges Program Office
International Activities Interagency Working Group
Social Science Coordinating Committee
Sustained Assessment Working Group

Decision support activities---including the development of assessments and other tools and information to support adaptation and mitigation decision making---are coordinated in a distributed fashion across the program and are part of the mandate of all IWGs and the Subcommittee on Global Change Research.

National Climate Assessments have been integral components of USGCRP since its inception. Along with its strategic role as coordinator of Federal global change research, USGCRP is required by the Global Change Research Act of 1990 to conduct a National Climate Assessment (NCA). The NCA is an important resource for understanding and communicating climate change science and impacts in the United States.

The United States Global Change Research Information Office or GCRIO provides access to data and information on climate change research and global change-related educational resources on behalf of the various US Federal Agencies that are involved in the USGCRP. The GCRIO handles requests for documents related to USCRP. They also have outreach services to both domestic (Federal, state, and local) and international target audiences (including governments, institutions, researchers, educators, students, and the general public) in an effort to showcase relevant activities and results of the US Global Change Research Program and to help increase the awareness of the availability of data and information resources of the participating Federal Agencies.

See also
 Global Change Information System

References

External links
 U.S. Global Change Research Program, GlobalChange.gov - Official Site
 

Research institutes in the United States
Office of Science and Technology Policy